The Buotama is a river in the Sakha Republic, Russia.

There is a nursery of wood bisons by the Ust-Buotama Reservoir on the lower reaches of the river. It was opened in 2006 with bisons imported from Canada.

Course
The river has its source in the northern part of the Aldan Highlands at an elevation of almost . It flows in an approximately ENE direction roughly parallel to the Lena through a relatively narrow valley by the Lena Plateau.

The Buotama freezes between October and November and thaws between the end of April or early May. The river flows across the Olyokminsky and Khangalassky districts.

The main tributaries are the Kharya-Yuryakh and Kuyuda on the right and the Talalakh on the left. There are about 200 lakes in its basin.

See also
List of rivers of Russia

References

External links

Geography - Yakutia Organized
По самой большой реке России. Июль. 2017. Фотоотчет.
Rivers of the Sakha Republic
Aldan Highlands